99.1 Energy FM (DXUB 99.1 MHz) is an FM station owned and operated by Ultrasonic Broadcasting System. Its studios and transmitter are located at Brgy. Manongol, Kidapawan.

References

External links
Energy FM Kidapawan FB Page

Radio stations in Cotabato
Radio stations established in 2013